Sun Zhijun (1933 – August 13, 2016) was a teacher of Cheng style baguazhang, in Beijing, China.  Born in 1933 in Cheng Village, Shen County, Hebei Province, Sun began his baguazhang training under Liu Ziyang, disciple of Cheng Dianhua (Cheng Tinghua's younger brother).  Later, he also had the opportunity to study with Cheng Yousheng (Cheng Dianhua's son) and Cheng Youxin (Cheng Tinghua's second son) in Beijing.  He had many disciples teaching his baguazhang around the world. At 23:20 on August 13, 2016, he died in Jingxian at the age of 83.

Besides traditional baguazhang, Sun also taught baguazhang to modern wushu players for competition, training over 10 baguazhang national champions in the past 20 years.

Championships: 

 1. 1964 Beijing Martial Art Championship Champion (palms & weapons)
 2. 1983 National Conventional Martial Arts Championship Champion
 3. 2004 World Conventional Martial Arts Festival Champion (palm & saber)

Coaching Achievements:
 1982 Coached Beijing Municipal Women's Martial Art Team
 1982 Coached at Eastern Municipal Martial Art Institute
 1983 Obtained National Coach of Excellence's title
 1983 2 Academic visits to Japan for Ba Gua Zhang exchanges
 1992/93/2005 3 Academic visits introducing Cheng style Ba Gua Zhang to Singapore
 2006 Coached Cheng style Ba Gua Zhang in Korea

Publications: 
 1983-86 Was appointed by the Chinese Wu Shu association, as an exclusive commissar of Cheng style to compile information on Cheng Style Baguazhang and weapons. (China)
 1990 Conventional Chinese Martial Arts (China) VCD
 1992 Ba Gua Zhang
 1992 Cheng Style Ba Gua Zhang
 1994; 2004 Swimming Body interlinked Ba Gua Zhang (China; Taipei, Singapore) Book
 2001 Swimming Body interlinked Ba Gua Zhang (including weapons) (China) VCD
 2005 Ba Gua Zhang Counter-Attack (China) VCD
 2005 Ba Gua Saber Counter-Attack (China) VCD
 2005 Elaborations on the Applications Of Swimming Body Interlinked Ba Gua Zhang (China) VCD
 2005 Hei Bei Xing Yi Boxing (China) VCD
 2012 You Shen Ba Gua Lian Huan Zhang (China) Book and DVD

References 
Biography of Sun Zhijun: http://sunzhijunbagua.2008red.com/

1933 births
Chinese baguazhang practitioners
Sportspeople from Hebei
People from Hengshui
Writers from Hebei
Chinese non-fiction writers
2016 deaths